In model theory, a mathematical discipline, a β-model (from the French "bon ordre", well-ordering) is a model which is correct about statements of the form "X is well-ordered". The term was introduced by Mostowski (1959) as a strengthening of the notion of ω-model. In contrast to the notation for set-theoretic properties named by ordinals, such as -indescribability, the letter β here is only denotational.

In set theory
It's a consequence of Shoenfield's absoluteness theorem that the constructible universe L is a β-model.

In analysis
β-models appear in the study of the reverse mathematics of subsystems of second-order arithmetic. In this context, a β-model of a subsystem of second-order arithmetic is a model M where for any Σ11 formula φ with parameters from M, (ω,M,+,×,0,1,<)⊨φ iff (ω,P(ω),+,×,0,1,<)⊨φ.p.243 Every β-model of second-order arithmetic is also an ω-model, since working within the model we can prove that < is a well-ordering, so < really is a well-ordering of the natural numbers of the model.

Axioms based on β-models provide a natural finer division of the strengths of subsystems of second-order arithmetic, and also provide a way to formulate reflection principles. For example, over ATR0, Π-CA0 is equivalent to the statement "for all  [of second-order sort], there exists a countable -model M such that .p.253 (Countable ω-models are represented by their sets of integers, and their satisfaction is formalizable in the language of analysis by an inductive definition.) Also, the theory extending KP with a canonical axiom schema for a recursively Mahlo universe (often called ) is logically equivalent to the theory Δ-CA+BI+(Every true Π-formula is satisfied by a β-model of Δ-CA).

Additionally, there's a connection between β-models and the hyperjump, provably in ACA0: for all sets  of integers,  has a hyperjump iff there exists a countable β-model  such that .p.251

References

Mathematical logic